Protasiv Yar is a ski complex close to the downtown of Kyiv, Ukraine. It is self-administered and was given a special status as the center for Olympic preparations.

There are several pistes and some with light for night skiing. There is snowmaking available if little or no snow is present. For snowboarding Protasiv Yar has a special snowboarding park.

Also equipment rental and a small cafe are open for winter sports lovers.

External links
 Protasiv Yar at Kiev Guide
 List of Olympic centers
 Official website

Ski areas and resorts in Ukraine
Sports venues in Kyiv
Neighborhoods in Kyiv